The Billy DeFrank Lesbian, Gay, Bisexual, and Transgender Community Center is a non-profit organization that promotes services for and about the gay community of San Jose, California and Santa Clara County. It started on March 3, 1981. The mission statement of the DeFrank Center is to "provide Community, Leadership, Advocacy, Support, and Services to Silicon Valley’s LGBT people and allies."

The DeFrank Center is named after Billy DeFrank, the stage name of William Price (1936–1980), an African-American and prominent 1970s gay rights activist and a member of the Bay Area's drag community. The Billy DeFrank Lesbian and Gay Community Center opened on March 1, 1981, in a two-room storefront on Keyes St. in south downtown San Jose, a year after Santa Clara County residents voted to repeal ordinances extending housing and employment protections to lesbians and gay men. The new DeFrank Center emerged from a desire to respond to that setback.

In the three decades that have passed since those modest beginnings on Keyes Street, the DeFrank Center has expanded to serve a large and diverse community. Each month more than a thousand people visit the DeFrank Center at its current headquarters on The Alameda in San Jose's gay-friendly St Leo neighborhood.

From all around the nine counties of the Bay Area, the DeFrank Center provides resources to lesbian, gay, bisexual and transgender people of all ages and backgrounds that are not available elsewhere. Their online newsletter has over 5,000 subscribers. The Center has events, activities, and support groups every week, and they have more than 90 volunteers. They also provide HIV testing and have library and art exhibits.

See also

List of LGBT community centers

References

"Billy DeFrank LGBTQ+ Community Center" http://www.sjsu.edu/justicestudies/for-students/internships/prospective-interns/intern-ops/advertisements/Billy%20DeFrank%20Center.pdf

External links
 Billy DeFrank Center

1981 establishments in California
Culture of San Jose, California
LGBT community centers in the United States
LGBT in California
LGBT culture in the San Francisco Bay Area
Organizations established in 1981